Badarpur is a town and a town area committee in Karimganj district in the state of Assam, India. Badarpur. Together with adjacent Badarpur Railway Town, it forms the Badarpur Urban Area, one of two notified urban areas in the district. The area is also popularly known as "Gateway to the Barak Valley" of Assam. Badarpur was a part of Karimganj district till 31st December 2022.

History
After the Conquest of Sylhet in 1303, a disciple of Shah Jalal known as Adam Khaki migrated and settled in present-day Deorail, Badarpur. Along with him Syed Shah Badaruddin settled in Bundashil area of present day . Badarpur is also popular in the valley because of its geographical point of view. Nowadays it has become the centre for various educational institutions including higher education like B.pharm,D.pharm etc. at Allama TR college of Pharmacy which is located at Hasanpur, Srigauri Hospital Road. Nabin Chandra College  is the most reputed educational institute at Badarpur. 

The railway junction under the Northeast Frontier Railway, the Badarpur Junction is the first railway station in the valley. It was first enacted and introduced by the then British Government under metre gauge rail lines from Badarpur to Lumding in 1898.

Geography
It has an average elevation of 16 metres (52 feet). Badarpur is surrounded by river Barak on the north, Barail hill range in the east and southeast and villages and paddy field in the west

Demographics
 India census, Badarpur had a population of around 33400 consisting of Town Committee, Railway Township and Chapar Census Town. Males constitute 52% of the population and females 48%. Badarpur has an average literacy rate of 84%, higher than the national average of 79.5%. 10% of the population is under 6 years of age. As of 28 March 2016, the population of Badarpur stands around 1,50,000

Religion 
Islam is the dominant religion in Badarpur followed by Hinduism, Buddhism, Christianity, Jainism.

Politics
Badarpur is part of Karimganj (Lok Sabha constituency).
At present the MLA of Badarpur is Abdul Aziz.

Tourism
Badarpur Fort .

References

Cities and towns in Karimganj district
Karimganj